Representatives of all 30 Major League Baseball teams and their 120 Minor League Baseball affiliates convene for four days each December in the Winter Meetings to discuss league business and conduct off-season trades and transactions. Attendees include league executives, team owners, general managers, team scouts, visitors from baseball-playing countries, trade show exhibitors, and people seeking employment with minor league organizations. The Rule 5 draft, in which minor league players who are not on a team's 40-man roster can be drafted by a major league team, is held on the last day of the meetings.

History
The tradition of baseball holding off-season meetings during December dates back to 1876, the first offseason of the National League. At the 1876 meetings, William Hulbert was selected to be the league's president, and two teams (the New York Mutuals and Philadelphia Athletics) were expelled from the league for failing to play all their scheduled games; they had refused the make their final road trip of the season. The Winter Meetings became an annual event in 1901. In 2022, The Winter Meetings will be held in San Diego, California. 

1927 – New York City
1928 – New York City
1929 – New York City
1930 – New York City
1931 – Chicago
1932 – New York City
1933 – Chicago
1934 – New York City
1935 – Chicago
1936 – New York City
1937 – Chicago
1938 – New York City
1939 – Cincinnati
1940 – Chicago
1941 – Chicago
1942 – Chicago
1943 – New York City
1944 – New York City
1945 – Chicago
1946 – Los Angeles
1947 – Miami
1948 – Chicago
1949 – New York City
1950 – St. Petersburg
1951 – Columbus
1952 – Phoenix
1953 – Atlanta
1954 – Houston
1955 – Columbus
1956 – Jacksonville
1957 – Colorado Springs
1958 – Washington, D.C.
1959 – St. Petersburg
1960 – Louisville
1961 – Tampa
1962 – Rochester
1963 – San Diego
1964 – Houston
1965 – Fort Lauderdale
1966 – Columbus
1967 – Mexico City
1968 – San Francisco
1969 – Fort Lauderdale
1970 – Los Angeles
1971 – Phoenix
1972 – Honolulu
1973 – Houston
1974 – New Orleans
1975 – Hollywood
1976 – Los Angeles
1977 – Honolulu
1978 – Orlando
1979 – Toronto
1980 – Dallas
1981 – Hollywood
1982 – Honolulu
1983 – Nashville
1984 – Houston
1985 – San Diego
1986 – Hollywood
1987 – Dallas
1988 – Atlanta
1989 – Nashville
1990 – Rosemont
1991 – Miami Beach
1992 – Louisville
1993 – Atlanta
1994 – Dallas
1995 – Los Angeles
1996 – Boston
1997 – New Orleans
1998 – Nashville
1999 – Anaheim
2000 – Dallas
2001 – Boston
2002 – Nashville
2003 – New Orleans
2004 – Anaheim
2005 – Dallas
2006 – Bay Lake
2007 – Nashville
2008 – Paradise
2009 – Indianapolis
2010 – Bay Lake
2011 – Dallas
2012 – Nashville
2013 – Bay Lake
2014 – San Diego
2015 – Nashville
2016 – National Harbor
2017 – Bay Lake
2018 – Paradise
2019 – San Diego
2020 – Virtual due to the COVID-19 pandemic, originally planned for Dallas
2021 – Canceled due to the 2021 MLB lockout, originally planned for Orlando
2022 – San Diego

Attendees
The Winter Meetings attract several thousand participants; in 2014 organizers anticipated 3,000 attendees. These include team owners, field managers, team scouts, players' agents, lawyers and accountants specializing in baseball, and visitors from baseball-playing countries. While it is rare for players who are under contract to attend, free agents often do come to take advantage of the opportunity to introduce themselves to many teams. At the 2014 Winter Meetings in San Diego, an estimated 750 media personnel received press passes.

Receptions are held nightly by each of the 30 major league teams for their minor league affiliates. A luncheon is also held for major league managers and baseball reporters.

Player trades and signings

With all the principals in one place, the Winter Meetings are typically the site of player trades and free-agent signings. However, the informal meetings that used to take place in hotel lobbies up until the end of the 20th century have been replaced by texting and emailing; most interactions take place in the privacy of suites due to the preponderance of media personnel and fans converging on the site.

Among the notable trades and signings that have been made at the Winter Meetings are:

At the 1975 Winter Meetings in Fort Lauderdale, new Chicago White Sox owner Bill Veeck sat at a table in the lobby behind a sign that said "Open for Business". During the course of the meetings, Veeck negotiated six trades involving 22 players.
At the 1988 Winter Meetings in Atlanta, the Texas Rangers closed three trades involving 15 players and signed free agent pitcher Nolan Ryan.
At the 1992 Winter Meetings in Louisville, first-time free agent Barry Bonds was signed by the San Francisco Giants for six years and $43 million. Bonds personally negotiated to have a hotel suite at his disposal during road games.
On the last day of the 2011 Winter Meetings in Dallas, Albert Pujols, who had won a World Series ring with the St. Louis Cardinals that fall, inked a 10-year, $250 million deal with the Los Angeles Angels.
 In the space of 24 hours at the 2014 Winter Meetings in San Diego, the Los Angeles Dodgers concluded six transactions with four teams, involving 19 players and a free agent.
 On consecutive days during the 2019 Winter Meetings in San Diego, Gerrit Cole signed a nine-year, $324 million deal with the New York Yankees, followed by Anthony Rendon agreeing to a seven-year, $245 million contract with the Los Angeles Angels the following evening.

Other events

Concurrent with the Winter Meetings, a trade show featuring close to 300 vendors of baseball equipment, services, and promotions takes place. Another annual event is the Professional Baseball Employment Opportunities Job Fair, during which recent college graduates seeking internships and employment with minor league organizations schedule on-site interviews. The month of December is considered "the height of baseball hiring season", as 400 to 500 workers are hired each year.

From 1951 to 2019, the "King of Baseball" title was awarded to a minor league veteran at the Winter Meetings banquet. With the 2020 minor-league season having been canceled due to COVID-19, the award was not presented in that year, and it was discontinued when MLB took over the minor leagues in 2021.

Several events associated with the Hall of Fame also take place at the Winter Meetings:
 The voting bodies that superseded the Veterans Committee, which are now the only bodies that elect long-retired players and non-playing personnel to the Hall, meet and vote.
 The winner of the Ford C. Frick Award for excellence in broadcasting is announced.
 The Baseball Writers' Association of America conducts its annual meeting and announces the recipient of its BBWAA Career Excellence Award (historically the J. G. Taylor Spink Award) for excellence in baseball writing. Both the Frick and Career Excellence Awards are presented as part of the Hall of Fame's annual induction festivities.
 The Scout of the Year award is presented at a special banquet.

Notes

References

Sources

Further reading

External links 
 Winter Meetings
 PBEO Job Fair
 The Baseball Trade Show

 Baseball Winter Meetings
December sporting events
Annual events in Major League Baseball